Lu Chunfang (born 15 May 1956) is a Chinese engineer who is deputy general manager of China National Railway Group Limited, a former vice minister of railways, and an academician of the Chinese Academy of Engineering.

Biography 
Lu was born in Li County, Hebei, on 15 May 1956. He enlisted in the People's Liberation Army in January 1975 and was assigned to the First Division of Mechanical battalion of Railway Corps as a repairman.
After resuming the college entrance examination, he entered Southwest Jiaotong University, where he majored in railway engineering. He also earned a master's degree from Tsinghua University in 2007.

After university in 1982, he became an engineer at the Ministry of Railways. He moved up the ranks to become party chief and general manager of China Railway Qinghai-Tibet Group Co., Ltd. in June 2001 and vice minister in March 2005, which was reshuffled as China National Railway Group Limited in March 2013. In January 2017, he became chairman of China Railway Society. In March 2018, he became a member of the 13th National Committee of the Chinese People's Political Consultative Conference.

Honours and awards 
 2015 State Science and Technology Progress Award (Special Prize)
 27 November 2017 Member of the Chinese Academy of Engineering (CAE)

References 

1956 births
Living people
Engineers from Hebei
Southwest Jiaotong University alumni
Tsinghua University alumni
Members of the 13th Chinese People's Political Consultative Conference
Members of the Chinese Academy of Engineering